Clash Battle Guilt Pride is the third studio album and second official release on Bridge 9 Records from American rock band Polar Bear Club.

Release
In April and May, the band participated in the Take Action Tour. In July and August, the group went on a tour of Europe with support from Man Overboard. It was released on September 13, 2011 through Bridge 9 Records. In March and April 2012, the band supported The Wonder Years on the Glamour Kills Spring 2012 tour in the US. To promote the tour, a compilation album was released that featured the bands covering one of the other bands' songs. Polar Bear Club's contribution was a cover of the Transit track "Skipping Stone".

Track listing

Personnel
Polar Bear Club
 Jimmy Stadt - vocals
 Chris Browne - guitar, backing vocals
 Nate Morris - guitar
 Erik Henning - bass
 Emmett Menke - drums

Studio personnel
 Brian McTernan - production, engineering

Additional personnel
 Richard Minino - artwork and illustrations

Details
 Studio: Salad Days Studio in Baltimore, Maryland
 Recording type: studio
 Recording mode: stereo
 SPARS code: n/a

References

External links
 Polar Bear Club MySpace
 Polar Bear Club Facebook
 Polar Bear Club PureVolume
 Polar Bear Club Last.fm

Polar Bear Club albums
2011 albums
Bridge 9 Records albums
Albums produced by Brian McTernan